Pilgrim Congregational Church may refer to:

United States
(by state)

 Pilgrim Congregational Church (Redding, California), designed by Frank Lloyd Wright
 Pilgrim Congregational Church (Arkansas City, Kansas), listed on the National Register of Historic Places (NRHP)
 Pilgrim Congregational Church (Taunton, Massachusetts), NRHP-listed
 Pilgrim Congregational Church (Worcester, Massachusetts), NRHP-listed
 Pilgrim Congregational Church (Duluth, Minnesota)
 Pilgrim Congregational Church (Cleveland, Ohio), NRHP-listed
 Pilgrim Congregational Church (Oklahoma City, Oklahoma), NRHP-listed

See also
Pilgrim Church (disambiguation)